Annie Vidal (born 17 September 1956) is a French politician of La République En Marche! (LREM) who has been a member of the National Assembly since 18 June 2017, representing the department of Seine-Maritime.

Political career
In parliament, Vidal serves on the Committee on Social Affairs.

Political positions
In July 2019, Vidal voted in favor of the French ratification of the European Union’s Comprehensive Economic and Trade Agreement (CETA) with Canada.

See also
 2017 French legislative election

References

1956 births
Living people
Deputies of the 15th National Assembly of the French Fifth Republic
La République En Marche! politicians
21st-century French women politicians
People from Maine-et-Loire
Women members of the National Assembly (France)
Politicians from Normandy
Deputies of the 16th National Assembly of the French Fifth Republic